Fateh Ali Khan may refer to:
 Bade Fateh Ali Khan (1935–2017), Khyal vocalist
 Fateh Ali Khan (Qawwali singer) (1901–1964)
 Nusrat Fateh Ali Khan (1948–1997), Pakistani vocalist and musician
 Rahat Fateh Ali Khan (born 1973), Pakistani musician